Lichinodium ahlneri is a species of filamentous lichen belonging to the family Lichinodiaceae. Described as a new species in 1963 by Aino Henssen, the specific epithet honours Swedish lichenologist Sten Ahlner.

It is native to Northern Europe and Northern America.

References

Leotiomycetes
Lichen species
Lichens described in 1963
Taxa named by Aino Henssen
Lichens of Northern Europe
Lichens of North America